Phaeochromatium is a genus of bacteria from the family of Chromatiaceae with one known species (Phaeochromatium fluminis).

References

Chromatiales
Bacteria genera
Monotypic bacteria genera
Taxa described in 2012